Mak Chi Wai (born January 29, 1937) is a Hong Kong sprint canoer who competed in the late 1970s. He was eliminated in the repechages of both the K-1 1000 m and the K-4 1000 m events at the 1976 Summer Olympics in Montreal, Quebec.

External links
Sports-reference.com profile

1937 births
Canoeists at the 1976 Summer Olympics
Hong Kong male canoeists
Living people
Olympic canoeists of Hong Kong